Wisconsin Walloon is a dialect of the Walloon language descendant from central Walloon. It is spoken in the Door Peninsula in Wisconsin, United States.  

The speakers of Wisconsin Walloon are descendants of the Belgian immigrants that came from the wave of immigration lasting from 1853–1857 that was recorded to have brought around 2,000 Belgians to Wisconsin. It is sometimes referred to by its speakers in English as "Belgian". Descendants of native Walloon speakers have since switched to English, and as of 2021, it has fewer than 50 speakers.

References

Bibliography 
 

Walloon culture
Oïl languages
Door County, Wisconsin
Belgian-American culture in Wisconsin